The 1927 Nova Scotia hurricane (also known as the 1927 Great August Gale or the Great Gale of August 24) was the deadliest tropical cyclone  striking Canada in the 20th century. The first observed storm of the season, this cyclone developed from a tropical wave over the deep tropics of the Atlantic Ocean on August 18. Initially a tropical storm, it moved west-northwestward and intensified into a Category 1 hurricane on the modern day Saffir–Simpson hurricane wind scale by August 19. The storm intensified significantly over the next few days, and by August 22, it peaked as a Category 3 hurricane with maximum sustained winds of 125 mph (205 km/h). Around that time, the system began curving northwestward and later northward. By August 23, it turned to the north-northeast and then began weakening on August 24. Thereafter, the storm accelerated toward Atlantic Canada. Late on August 24, the hurricane struck near Yarmouth, Nova Scotia, as a Category 2 hurricane, just before becoming extratropical.

In New England, rainfall caused minor street flooding, especially in central Massachusetts and Maine, where  of precipitation fell in the city of Portland. Of the 173–192 fatalities in Canada, most of them occurred due to damaged or missing ships, with two boats losing their entire crew. On land, Nova Scotia was impacted most significantly. Heavy rainfall washed out 20–25 percent of the rail lines, which disrupted rail service. Flooding also damaged numerous roads and swept away bridges, making traveling difficult. Crop damage from the hurricane was severe as the storm destroyed about half of the fruit, vegetable, and hay harvest, leaving a loss of $1 million (1927 USD).  Property damage in the province was in the thousands of dollars range. There were many electrical and telephone service outages. The storm's rains and winds caused similar but less severe damage in the provinces of New Brunswick, Prince Edward Island, and Newfoundland. Overall, the hurricane caused just under $1.6 million in damage.

Meteorological history

Moving west-northwestward, it intensified into a Category 1 hurricane on the modern day Saffir–Simpson hurricane wind scale by August 19. The storm deepened significantly over the next few days, becoming a Category 2 late on August 20 and reaching Category 3 at 06:00 UTC on August 21. The cyclone peaked as a Category 3 hurricane with sustained winds of 125 mph (205 km/h) and a minimum pressure of  around 06:00 UTC on August 22. The latter was observed by the S.S. Maraval, while the former was estimated using the pressure-wind relationship. Around that time, the system began curving northwestward and later northward. By August 23, it turned to the north-northeast and then began weakening on August 24, falling to Category 2 intensity by 12:00 UTC.

Thereafter, the storm accelerated toward Atlantic Canada. Around 18:00 UTC on August 24, the hurricane made its closest approach to the United States, passing about 60 mi (100 km) southeast of Nantucket island in Massachusetts. About five hours later, the system struck near Yarmouth, Nova Scotia, as a Category 2 hurricane with winds of 105 mph (165 km/h). Based on distribution of rainfall over Nova Scotia, the storm was believed to have made landfall as a tropical cyclone. By 00:00 UTC on August 25, the hurricane transitioned into an extratropical cyclone. The remnants moved quickly east-northeastward, striking Newfoundland and later Iceland, before dissipating near Jan Mayen on August 29.

Preparations and impact
Shipping ahead of the hurricane received repeated warnings broadcast by both American and Canadian weather officials. Small craft warnings and a hurricane warning for New York City were also issued. However, the majority of fishing vessels in Atlantic Canada in this period did not have radios, leaving the large fishing fleet on the offshore banks unaware of the approaching disaster.

Because of the fast forward speed of the hurricane, the damage was minimal in New England. However, the hurricane was devastating in Atlantic Canada as the storm caused tremendous damage and 173-192 fatalities, most of which were at sea. The hurricane was the deadliest tropical cyclone (or remnants) in Canada at least since a hurricane in 1900.

New England
Rainfall from the hurricane caused flooding portions of New England, especially Maine and Massachusetts. Dirt roads were washed out, forcing evacuations, while a  stone wall collapsed. Damage reached the thousands of dollars range. In nearby Shawsheen Village, a pond overflowed, inundating yards and streets. Rainfall from the hurricane contributed to causing the Taunton River to reach its then-highest known crest at some locations, forcing floodgates to be opened. Street cars stalled or were delayed as long as 45 minutes. In Maine, precipitation up to 2 in (50.8 mm) was reported across the state, causing isolated street flooding. Offshore, the hurricane damaged a fishing ship, leaving one dead and three injured.

Atlantic Canada

Nova Scotia received heavy rainfall up to 4 in (102 mm) and gale-force winds. The hardest hit area was Harbourville and adjacent settlements along the "Bay Shore" coastline of the Bay of Fundy. There the hurricane completely destroyed a gravel road which had been built shortly before the storm's impact. Another road connecting to a hotel was also severely damaged. Heavy rainfall brought by the hurricane caused landslides and flooding along the Harbourville Mountain which washed out numerous roads. In the Annapolis Valley, the rainfall fell so quickly that drainage ditches and small creeks overflowed. In Lakeville, flooding washed away a  bridge, and fallen trees and other storm debris littered the streets and roads. The Cornwallis River overflowed its banks, causing serious flash flooding. Near Harrington's Crossing, a small creek overflowed its banks, stalling numerous automobiles. Roads were extensively impacted in Digby, Wolfville, Yarmouth, and Annapolis County, which suffered $150,000 in damage to streets alone. Overall, there was about $500,000 in damage to roads in Nova Scotia.

Heavy rainfall washed out the railroad lines between Halifax and Yarmouth. A power plant in Pictou County suffered $500 in damage after the roof blew off. In Springhill, strong winds downed trees, fences, and houses. Throughout Nova Scotia, flooding washed out 20–25 percent of the rail lines across Nova Scotia, disrupting rail service. Flooding also damaged numerous roads and swept away bridges making traveling difficult. Crop damage from the hurricane was severe as the storm destroyed 50 percent of the fruit, vegetable, and hay harvest, leaving a loss of $1 million. Other parts of Nova Scotia received similar damage. Overall, property damage in the province was in the thousands of dollars range and there were many electrical and telephone service outages.

A car tumbled into washed out culvert in Horseman's Hill, injuring three people. Several bridges and culvert were destroyed in Springhill. A dam broke near University of St. Joseph's College, severely flooding the campus and demolishing the gymnasium. Throughout the province, streets, bridges, gardens, and crops, particularly hay and grain, were damaged, while railroad lines were destroyed. Power outages and loss of telephone services were common. Damage in New Brunswick totaled at least $51,000. In Prince Edward Island,  of rain fell in Charlottetown and winds of 30 mph (45 km/h) were observed. The city was littered with debris. Generally minor street flooding occurred. Fruit trees and crops suffered extensive damage. At the exhibition grounds, buildings and fences received about $1,000 in damage.

Offshore, seventy-five fishing boats of the Lunenburg fishing fleet were reported missing in the Grand Banks. Of the seventy-five, four vessels were reported as total losses. The Joyce Smith and Clayton Walters were the first two fishing vessels to fall victim to the hurricane. The Joyce Smith was carrying 22 men (mostly from Newfoundland) and it and the Walters were fishing off the coast of Sable Island at the time of the hurricane. Newspaper reports suggested that both fishing boats did not survive the storm and all 43 crewmen perished at sea. The Mahala, another fishing schooner, was also listed among the ships missing after the hurricane. A search in the area where the ship was reported missing turned up nothing and it was assumed that the ship sank along with its eighteen fishermen. The fourth fishing boat to be reported missing was the Uda R. Corkum, which was carrying a crew of 21 men and 1800 quintals of fish. In all, the loss from all four vessels totaled up to 80 and monetary losses from all four ships totaled over $100,000. Four more fishing boats also sank, taking 33 lives. In addition to the Canadian fishing boats, the famous U.S. racing and fishing schooner Columbia. carrying 22 crew men (many from Nova Scotia) sank during the storm off the coast of Sable Island. There were no survivors.

The Nova Scotia hurricane of 1927 followed another tragic August storm the previous year and together they became known as "The August Gales", remembered for generations as one of the worst tragedies in the fisheries of Maritime Canada. The severe shipping losses, especially among banks fishing schooners, accelerated a move to outfit Canadian schooners with motors and radios. Today, the hurricane is commemorated in a waterfront monument and an exhibit at the Fisheries Museum of the Atlantic in Lunenburg, Nova Scotia.

See also

List of Atlantic hurricanes
List of Canada hurricanes
1926 Nova Scotia hurricane
Hurricane Bill (2009)
Hurricane Earl (2010)

Notes

References

External links
Best Track data on the 1927 Hurricane
Canadian Hurricane Centre

Nova Scotia Hurricane
1927 Nova Scotia
1927
1927
Nova Scotia Hurricane
1927 in Nova Scotia
Natural disasters in Nova Scotia
1927 natural disasters
1927 meteorology